Stephen Chan Chit-kwai, BBS, JP (born 1949) was a member of the Central and Western District Council for the University constituency since 1991, and was unopposed in 1999 and 2003. He lost his seat in the 2019 District Council elections. He joined the University of Hong Kong in 1977, and is now manager of the Lady Ho Tung Hall Dormitories of the Li ka-shing Faculty of Medicine. He received the HKU 35-year long-term service award in 2013.

References

1949 births
Living people
Alumni of the University of Hong Kong
Members of the Election Committee of Hong Kong, 2007–2012
Members of the Election Committee of Hong Kong, 2012–2017
District councillors of Central and Western District
Hong Kong Progressive Alliance politicians